The Western Code is a 1932 American Western film directed by John P. McCarthy and starring Tim McCoy, Nora Lane, and Mischa Auer.

The film contains the first known instance of the phrase "This town ain't big enough for the both of us" in popular media.

Cast
Tim McCoy as Tim Barrett
Nora Lane as Polly Lewis
Mischa Auer as Chapman
Dwight Frye as Dick Lewis
Wheeler Oakman as Nick Grindell
Matthew Betz as Warden
Gordon De Main as Sheriff Fred Purdy
Jack Kirk as Deputy Chuck
Bud Osborne as Dutch Miller

References

External links

1932 films
1932 Western (genre) films
American black-and-white films
Columbia Pictures films
American Western (genre) films
Films directed by John P. McCarthy
1930s American films